Monthalia is a small unincorporated rural community upon  Gonzales County Road 143 joining US 90A and FM 466, as a bridge across the Guadalupe River; acting as a bypass of neighboring Belmont, Texas. At its north end, it connects directly to the ghost town Oak Forest as well as "MA Wade Dam."

The community had only 65 people as of the 2000 census. It is primarily home to livestock ranchers and has no schools or businesses. As a testament to its livestock ranching, Nolan Ryan Beef operates several ranches in the area raising cattle.

The Guadalupe River borders it to the north. The vegetation of the area consists of Bermuda grass pastures, stands of post oaks, and dense fields of mesquite.

Monthalia was first settled in 1846.  It progressed to have a church and masonic lodge by 1868 and a post office was established in 1893. The community later built a school and even an auto shop and butcher.  The town declined and many functions were later operated as a co-op with the residents.  The school closed in 1948 and the post office was closed in 1968; both were moved a short distance to neighboring Cost, TX.

Notes

Unincorporated communities in Gonzales County, Texas
Unincorporated communities in Texas
Populated places on the Guadalupe River (Texas)
1846 establishments in Texas
Populated places established in 1846